Takachiho "Taki" Inoue (井上 隆智穂 Inoue Takachiho, born 5 September 1963) is a retired Japanese racing driver.

Biography
Inoue was born in Kobe. He competed in the British Formula Ford Championship in 1988, followed by a spell in All-Japan Formula Three from 1989 to 1993 and a season in the International Formula 3000 championship in 1994.

Formula One

He participated in 18 Formula One Grand Prix races. His first appearance was a one-off race for Simtek at the 1994 Japanese Grand Prix, from which he retired. For the next year he moved to Footwork Arrows. Over the course of his career he scored no championship points.

He is perhaps best remembered for two bizarre incidents while driving for Footwork in 1995. The first occurred after a practice session at Monaco, when his stalled car was being towed back to the pits when it was hit by a course car, driven by Jean Ragnotti, causing it to roll into the barriers, although Inoue was fit to race the next day. The second happened on Hungarian GP on live TV worldwide – attempting to assist the marshals in putting out the engine fire which had forced him out of the race, a safety car Tatra 623 driven to the scene by a marshal hit him, injuring his leg, although he recovered for the next race.

 
For most of the season his team-mate was Gianni Morbidelli, but late in the season Max Papis replaced Morbidelli, and was sometimes outpaced by Inoue.

Entering the  season, Inoue lobbied Tyrrell for a drive, but the team chose Ukyo Katayama with his Mild Seven sponsorship money from Japan Tobacco. Instead, he was announced in January to drive for the Minardi team. However, one of his personal sponsors pulled out at the last minute and Inoue withdrew from F1. Minardi took on Giancarlo Fisichella instead. Fisichella, the team's test driver in 1995, had backing from Marlboro Italy.

With his sponsorship reduced, Inoue was out of a drive in Formula One. After a brief switch to sportscars, he retired from racing at the end of 1999 and now manages drivers in his own country.

He is also known for his self-deprecating humour, as Inoue has publicly proclaimed himself as the "worst driver in Formula One", admits that he initially had no idea what a pit stop was, and in an interview with the Top Gear magazine in 2015, states that he was "not good enough to drive in F1".

Racing record

Career summary

Complete International Formula 3000 results
(key) (Races in bold indicate pole position; races in italics indicate fastest lap.)

Complete Formula One results
(key)

References

External links 

 

1963 births
Japanese racing drivers
Japanese Formula One drivers
Simtek Formula One drivers
Arrows Formula One drivers
Living people
Sportspeople from Kobe
International Formula 3000 drivers
Super Nova Racing drivers
Japanese Formula 3 Championship drivers
Super GT drivers